Titus Andronicus is an American indie rock band formed in Glen Rock, New Jersey, in 2005. The band is composed of singer-lyricist-guitarist Patrick Stickles, guitarist Liam Betson, bassist R.J. Gordon, and drummer Chris Wilson. The group takes its name from the Shakespeare play Titus Andronicus, and has cited musical and stylistic influences such as Neutral Milk Hotel and Pulp.

Career
Titus Andronicus's first album, The Airing of Grievances, was released in April 2008 and was described as the sound of a "violent, overblown and irreverent" indie band in a positive review by Pitchfork. The band went on extensive tours of North America and Europe to promote the album through 2009, including a "Bring On The Dudes Tour" with friends the So So Glos and tours opening for Ted Leo and the Pharmacists and Lucero.

In 2010 the band released their second album, The Monitor, through XL Recordings. A sprawling concept album loosely based on themes relating to the American Civil War, it was critically well received, and debuted at No. 7 on the Billboard Heatseekers chart. That month, Rolling Stone named the band one of the seven best new bands of 2010. The band continued their extensive touring that included a tour of record stores, tours opening for the Pogues, Bright Eyes, and Okkervil River, plus appearances at Coachella Valley Music and Arts Festival, Lollapalooza, and Roskilde Festival. Titus Andronicus recorded a version of Nirvana's "Breed" for the tribute album Newermind at this time as well.

Their third album, Local Business, was released in 2012. A more stripped down record, Local Business was recorded live in the studio with almost no overdubs, creating an album that was "plug-in-and-play" ready, helping the band sound as close as possible to the album when playing live. 
It was listed at number 38 on Rolling Stones 50 Best Albums of 2012, reached number 105 on the Billboard Top 200 chart, and gained positive reviews as well as a 7.0 from Pitchfork. Touring for the album included an expansive headlining tour with opener Ceremony, a co-headlining trek of the United Kingdom with Fucked Up, and another tour with the So So Glos dubbed the "Bring Back The Dudes Tour."

The band released their fourth album, The Most Lamentable Tragedy, on 2015 via Merge Records. Taking the form of a 93-minute, 29-song, five-act rock opera (including covers of Daniel Johnston and the Pogues), Stickles described the record as a "complicated metaphor about manic depression, melding elements of philosophy, psychology, and science fiction through the plight of one troubled protagonist’s inner demons." The band also disclosed a film element to the album and thus far released a 15-minute music video covering Act Two. The Most Lamentable Tragedy was released to positive reviews, and the group announced a "TMLT Around the World Tour" covering the United States and Europe.

Their fifth LP, A Productive Cough, was released in 2018 via Merge Records. It featured a "ballad oriented approach" not seen  previously on Titus Andronicus albums, and was followed by a stripped down two piece tour featuring Stickles and keyboardist Alexander Molini. Their sixth album, An Obelisk, was released in 2019 via Merge Records.

Titus Andronicus has performed live on Late Night with Jimmy Fallon and Last Call with Carson Daly twice. Their song "Titus Andronicus" was used in an episode of the TV show Elementary entitled "The Adventure of the Nutmeg Concoction". "Titus Andronicus Forever" was featured in the TV show Bored to Death and the film Premium Rush, while "Dimed Out" was used to close out the first season of the Showtime show Billions.

Original keyboardist Matt Miller died in March 2021 at the age of 34.

Their seventh studio album The Will to Live was released on September 30, 2022.

Band members

Current members
 Patrick Stickles – lead vocals, guitar (2005–present)
 Liam Betson – guitar, backing vocals (2006–2008, 2009, 2011–2013, 2016–present)
 R.J. Gordon – bass, backing vocals (2016–present)
 Chris Wilson – drums (2016–present)
 Michael Carson - keyboards (2022-present)
Former members
 Sarim Al-Rawi – drums (2005–2006)
 Alexi Crawford – guitar (2005–2006)
 Matt Miller † – keyboard (2005–2006) (died 2021)
 Dan Tews – guitar (2005–2008)
 Ian Graetzer – bass (2005–2011)
 Martin Courtney – keyboard (2006)

 Ian Dykstra – drums (2006–2007)
 Alex Tretiak – drums (2007)
 Andrew Cedermark – guitar (2007, 2008–2009)
 Ian O'Neill – guitar (2008–2009)
 Pete Feigenbaum – guitar (2009)
 Amy Klein – guitar, violin (2010–2011)
 Dave Robbins – keyboard, guitar (2010–2011)
 Elio DeLuca – piano, keyboards (2015–2016; 2008–2015 session)
 Alex Molini — piano, keyboards (2017-2018)
 Jonah Maurer – guitar (2013–2016)
 Julian Veronesi – bass, backing vocals (2011–2015)
 Adam Reich – guitar, keyboards, backing vocals (2012–2016)
 Eric Harm – drums, backing vocals (2007–2015)

Timeline

Discography

Studio albums

Singles, EPs, and mixtapes
 Titus Andronicus EP (2005, Self-Released)
 "Titus Andronicus" b/w "Fear and Loathing in Mahwah, New Jersey" 7" (2007, Shake Appeal Recording Company)
 "Albert Camus" b/w "Upon Viewing Brueghel's 'Landscape with the Fall of Icarus'" 7" (2007, Troubleman Unlimited Records)
 "Titus Andronicus" b/w "Every Time I See the Light Parts 1 & 2" 7" (2008, Merok Records)
 "My Time Outside The Womb" b/w "To Old Friends & New" 7" (2009, Merok Records)
 The Innocents Abroad – Live in London 23/02/09 vinyl-only LP (2009, Rough Trade Shop Exclusive)
 "Four Score and Seven" 7" (2010, XL Recordings)
 Split 7" w/Free Energy "Anxiety Block" b/w "I'm Going Down" (2010, XL Recordings/DFA)
 Titus Andronicus LLC Mixtape Vol 1 (2012, Self-Released)
 Split 7" w/Ceremony "In a Big City" b/w "Everything Burns" (2012, XL Recordings/Matador Records)
 Record Store Day 12" "Still Life with Hot Deuce and Silver Platter" b/w "(I've Got A) Date Tonight," "The Dog" (2013, XL Recordings)
 Seven 7"s Series #1 & #2: 7-Year Anniversary 2x7” (2014, Self-Released)
 Seven 7"s Series #3: Split w/Wicked Kind "Stranded (On My Own)" b/w "Sport," "Piece of the Pie" (2014, Self-Released)
 Seven 7"s Series #4: Split w/Lost Boy? "Fatal Flaw" b/w "Dairy Queen" (2015, Self-Released)
 Titus Andronicus LLC Mixtape Vol 2: Sorry About the Delay (2015, Self-Released)
 Seven 7"s Series #5: Split w/Diarrhea Planet "Upon Viewing Oregon's Landscape With the Flood of Detritus" b/w "Enter The Great Gate," "Babyhead" (2015, Self-Released)
 Seven 7"s Series #6: Split w/Spider Bags "Dimed Out" b/w "Dishrag" (2015, Self-Released)
 Seven 7"s Series #7: "Mr. E Mann [Remix]" b/w "Fired Up [Remix]" (2016, Self-Released)
 Titus Andronicus Mixtape Volume III : A Reductive Scoff (2018, Self-Released)
 Home Alone On Halloween 12" EP (2018, Merge Records)

References

External links

Official website
 
Venus Zine & Dirty Laundry TV present: Titus Andronicus
Interview with Patrick Stickles on TheWaster.com
Synconation speaks with Patrick Stickles of Titus Andronicus

Indie rock musical groups from New Jersey
People from Glen Rock, New Jersey
XL Recordings artists
Musical groups established in 2005
Band
Merge Records artists